The Molly Gibson Formation is a geologic formation in Arizona. It preserves fossils dating back to the Cretaceous period.

See also

 List of fossiliferous stratigraphic units in Arizona
 Paleontology in Arizona

References
 

Cretaceous Arizona